The 2017–18 Saint Mary's Gaels women's basketball team represents Saint Mary's College of California in the 2017–18 NCAA Division I women's basketball season. The Gales, led by twelfth year head coach Paul Thomas, play their home games at the McKeon Pavilion and were members of the West Coast Conference. They finished the season 20–11, 13–5 in WCC play to finish in second place. They lost in the quarterfinals of the WCC women's tournament to Pacific. They received an automatic bid to the Women's National Invitation Tournament where they lost to New Mexico in the first round.

Previous season
They finished the season 20–13, 13–5 in WCC play to finish in a tie for second place. They advanced to the championship game of the WCC women's tournament where they lost to Gonzaga. They received an at-large bid to the WNIT where they lost to Colorado State in the first round.

Roster

Schedule and results

|-
!colspan=9 style=| Non-conference regular season

|-
!colspan=9 style=| WCC regular season

|-
!colspan=9 style=| WCC Women's Tournament

|-
!colspan=9 style=| WNIT

See also
 2017–18 Saint Mary's Gaels men's basketball team

References

Saint Mary's Gaels women's basketball seasons
Saint Mary's
Saint Mary's
Saint Mary's
Saint Mary's